Michael Richard Barton (14 October 1914 at East Dereham, Norfolk, England – 1 July 2006 in England) was an English first-class cricketer. A right-handed batsman, in a first-class career lasting from 1935 to 1955, he scored 5965 runs at 25.82, with 7 hundreds and a highest score of 192.

He was educated at Oriel College, Oxford, and appeared for Oxford University from 1935 to 1937, winning a Blue in the latter two years. He also played for Norfolk in the Minor Counties Championship from 1933 to 1947.

After his Oxford days his first-class career appeared to be over, but Surrey found themselves short of a captain (who in those days by convention had to be an amateur) and approached him. He captained them in some games in 1948, and was the official club captain from 1949 to 1951. Surrey were the joint County Champions with Lancashire in 1950.

He was Surrey President in 1983.

References

External links 
 Surrey County Cricket Club website obituary
 Cricinfo profile

1914 births
2006 deaths
English cricketers
Surrey cricketers
Surrey cricket captains
Presidents of Surrey County Cricket Club
Oxford University cricketers
Norfolk cricketers
Combined Services cricketers
Free Foresters cricketers
People from Dereham
Marylebone Cricket Club cricketers
North v South cricketers
Sportspeople from Norfolk
Alumni of Oriel College, Oxford